Miss Earth Venezuela 2006, or Sambil Model Venezuela 2006, was held on June 1, 2006, in Centro Sambil Margarita, Pampatar, Margarita Island, Venezuela. The winner was Marianne Puglia, and represented Venezuela in the Miss Earth 2006 beauty pageant, in Philippines and won the Miss Earth - Fire title, or Third runner up. She also won the special prize Best in Swimsuit.

Results
Sambil Model / Miss Earth Venezuela 2006: Marianne Puglia
1st Runner-up: Xenia Prieto
2nd Runner-up: Dayana Colmenares
3rd Runner-up: Mariannys Caraballo
4th Runner-up: María Eugenia Romero

Awards
Miss Press: Marianne Puglia
Sambil Model Caracas: Marianne Puglia
Sambil Model Maracaibo: Jennifer Schell
Sambil Model Margarita: Mariannys Caraballo
Sambil Model Valencia: Jennifer Maduro

Contestants

 Anabella Araujo (Valencia)
 Andreína Gómez (Margarita)
 Angela Ochoa (Margarita)
 Anyela Quiñones (Caracas)
 Astrid Lozada (Caracas)
 Dayana Colmenares (Caracas)
 Deissy Parada (Maracaibo)
 Isabel Usón (Valencia)
 Jennifer Maduro (Valencia)
 Jennifer Schell (Maracaibo)
 Jéssica Barboza (Maracaibo)

 Julia Mendoza (Valencia)
 Karina Betancourt (Caracas)
 Laura Montero (Maracaibo)
 Luzmila Dubuc (Maracaibo)
 María Eugenia Romero (Caracas)
 María Laura Malpica (Valencia)
 Marianne Puglia (Caracas)
 Mariannys Caraballo (Margarita)
 Sarina Regueira (Margarita)
 Stephany Martínez (Margarita)
 Xenia Prieto (Caracas)

References

External links
 Miss Earth / Sambil Model Venezuela Official Website
 Miss Earth Official Page

Miss Earth Venezuela
2006 beauty pageants
2006 in Venezuela